National Route 405 (N405) forms part of the Philippine highway network. It runs through western Cavite. It connects the municipality of Naic to Caylabne Bay.

Route description 
The highway, though consisting of component roads of different names, is officially named by DPWH as Juanito Remulla Sr. Road, which is the official name of one of its component roads, Governor's Drive.

Governor's Drive

N405 runs from the municipality of Naic to Ternate, Cavite as Governor's Drive. It starts at the intersection with N402, specifically the Naic–Indang Road and Capt. C. Nazareno Street in Barangay San Roque, Naic. It then passes through the municipalities of Maragondon and Ternate. Finally, it meets its intersection with Caylabne Road and Ternate–Nasugbu Road at the Mounts Palay-Palay–Mataas-na-Gulod Protected Landscape in Ternate.

Caylabne Road
N405 then turns north as Caylabne Road, which connects Ternate to Caylabne Bay. The highway ends at Point Mai, where a gate to Caylabne Bay Resort is found, as the road continues into the resort as an unnumbered street.

References 

Roads in Cavite